Whitewater Falls is an abandoned townsite in sections 27 and 34 of Whitewater Township in Winona County, Minnesota.

History
Whitewater Falls had a post office from 1856 until 1899.  The town took its name from the Whitewater River. Clark William Trisler (1840-1921), farmer and Minnesota state legislator, lived in Whitewater Falls with his wife and family.

References

External links
 "Whitewater Township, Beavers, Whitewater Falls" from C.M. Foote & Co. (1894).  historicmapworks.com 
 Curtiss-Wedge, Franklyn, "History of Whitewater Township, Winona County, Minnesota, The History of Winonia County, Minnesota.  H. C. Cooper Jr. & Co. (1913)

Former populated places in Minnesota
Former populated places in Winona County, Minnesota